Frelinghien is a commune in the Nord department in northern France. It is part of the Métropole Européenne de Lille.

Heraldry

See also
Communes of the Nord department

References

Communes of Nord (French department)
French Flanders